Robert Addison Day is an American businessman, investor, and philanthropist. He was the founder and former chairman and chief executive officer of Trust Company of the West until 2009. He is the chairman and president of the W. M. Keck Foundation.

Early life
Robert Addison Day is the grandson of Superior Oil Company founder William Myron Keck. He was born in 1943 in Los Angeles, California. He received a Bachelor of Science in economics from Claremont McKenna College in 1965.  He was enrolled in ROTC while at Claremont McKenna College.

Career
Day started his career at the financial firm White, Weld and Company in New York City. In 1971, he founded the Trust Company of the West. In 2001, he sold 70% of it to the Société Générale for $2.5 billion.

Day serves on the board of directors of Freeport-McMoRan, Fisher Scientific, and Société Générale. He also sits on the board of trustees of the Center for the Study of the Presidency and Congress and the Brookings Institution, where he was chairman from 1990 to 1998. He is a member of the Business Council. From 2001 to 2003, he sat on the President's Intelligence Advisory Board. He is also a member of the Alfalfa Club, the California Club, the Center for Strategic and International Studies, and the Council on Foreign Relations.

As of September 2011, he is worth US$1.2. billion, and he is the 283rd richest person in the United States. He owns 600,000 acres of timberland in Florida.

Political activities and donations to alma mater
In October 2006, Day hosted a fundraiser with then-President George W. Bush, which raised US$1 million for the Republican Party. In 2015, Day donated $1.1 million to Super PACs supporting Republican presidential candidates Jeb Bush and Carly Fiorina.

In 2007, Day made a gift of $200 million to his alma mater Claremont McKenna College.

He is the chairman and president of the W. M. Keck Foundation.

Personal life
Day is  married to Marlyn Gates. He has 3 children and lives in Los Angeles, California.

References

Living people
1943 births
20th-century American businesspeople
21st-century American businesspeople
21st-century American philanthropists
American billionaires
American chief executives of financial services companies
American investors
Businesspeople from Los Angeles
California Republicans
Claremont McKenna College alumni
People from Bel Air, Los Angeles
Philanthropists from California